Augustin is a commune in Brașov County, Transylvania, Romania. It is composed of a single village, Augustin. Formerly part of Ormeniș, it was split off in 2005 to form a separate commune.

The village is located at the northern edge of the county, on the border with Covasna County. It lies in the southern part of the Baraolt basin, on the left bank of the Olt River. The Augustin train station serves Line 300 of the CFR network, which connects Bucharest with the Hungarian border near Oradea.

At the 2011 census, 51.8% of inhabitants were Roma, 46% Romanians and 2.2% Hungarians.

In 2007, the Augustin hermitage for nuns was built on the spot known as Monastery Hill, after a monastery that used to be there, before being destroyed in 1760.

See also
Dacian fortress of Augustin

References

Communes in Brașov County
Localities in Transylvania
Romani communities in Romania